Kirby Law (born March 11, 1977) is a Canadian former professional ice hockey winger who played nine games over parts of three seasons in the National Hockey League (NHL) for the Philadelphia Flyers.

Playing career
Born in McCreary, Manitoba, Law was not selected in any NHL draft. In the 2005-06 AHL season, his final in that league, Law led the league in scoring with 110 points for the Houston Aeros. Law left the AHL and in his fourth year abroad played in Swiss Hockey League with HC Ambri-Piotta. Law played for Team Canada at the 2007 Spengler Cup.

Career statistics

Awards and honours

References

External links
 

1977 births
Adirondack Red Wings players
Brandon Wheat Kings players
Canadian ice hockey right wingers
EHC Biel players
Genève-Servette HC players
HC Ambrì-Piotta players
HC Fribourg-Gottéron players
HC Neftekhimik Nizhnekamsk players
Houston Aeros (1994–2013) players
Ice hockey people from Manitoba
Lethbridge Hurricanes players
Living people
Louisville Panthers players
Dauphin Kings players
Orlando Solar Bears (IHL) players
People from Parkland Region, Manitoba
Philadelphia Flyers players
Philadelphia Phantoms players
Saskatoon Blades players
Undrafted National Hockey League players
Canadian expatriate ice hockey players in Russia
Canadian expatriate ice hockey players in Switzerland